Thomas William Schoener (born August 9, 1943, in Lancaster, Pennsylvania) is an American ecologist and professor at University of California, Davis. In 1969, he received his Ph.D. from Harvard University, where he was a Junior Fellow. He served on the faculty at the University of Washington before moving to Davis. He is an expert in community ecology and in evolutionary ecology, including experimental manipulation of island vertebrate and spider communities. Dr. Schoener's research has been both theoretical and empirical.

He was the 1986 recipient of the Robert H. MacArthur Award given by the Ecological Society of America.

He is a highly cited scientist.

References

American ecologists
Living people
Harvard University alumni
University of California, Davis faculty
1943 births
Members of the United States National Academy of Sciences
Fellows of the Ecological Society of America